Janina (minor planet designation: 383 Janina) is a Themistian asteroid, approximately  in diameter. It is spectral B-type and is probably composed of primitive carbonaceous chondritic material.

It was discovered by Auguste Charlois on 29 January 1894 in Nice. The reference of the name is unknown, though it is the French name of Ioannina in Greece, as well as a common German woman's name, both of which probably descend from Johannes.

References

External links 
 
 

000383
Discoveries by Auguste Charlois
Named minor planets
000383
000383
18940129